The 2014 Courier Connections Renault UK Clio Cup was a multi-event, one make motor racing championship held across England and one event in Scotland. The championship featured a mix of professional motor racing teams and privately funded drivers competing in the new Clio Renaultsport 200 Turbo EDC that conformed to the technical regulations for the championship. It formed part of the extensive program of support categories built up around the BTCC centerpiece after signing a three year extension to be on the package until the end of 2016. It was the 19th Renault Clio Cup United Kingdom season, commencing on 30 March at Brands Hatch – on the circuit's Indy configuration – and concluded on 12 October at the same venue, utilising the Grand Prix circuit, after sixteen races held at eight meetings, all in support of the 2014 British Touring Car Championship season.

VitalRacing with Team Pyro driver Mike Bushell claimed the championship title by 43 points ahead of SV Racing with KX's Josh Cook, with Graduate Cup winner Jordan Stilp of 20Ten Racing finishing third, a further 21 points in arrears. With only one win in the first half of the season, Bushell trailed Cook for much of the early season. However, a run of three wins in four races at Knockhill and Rockingham allowed Bushell to achieve an advantage over Cook. Cook won six races to Bushell's four, but three retirements cost Cook as a whole. Stilp recorded three wins during the campaign, including the season's only maximum score with a double win (as well as the bonus points for fastest laps) at Croft. James Colburn and Alex Morgan each took two victories, but both finished behind Ant Whorton-Eales, who achieved six podium finishes without a victory. The only other driver to take a victory was Paul Rivett, who won the final race of the season at Brands Hatch, en route to the Masters Cup title. The entrants' championship was comfortably won by SV Racing with KX, finishing over 200 points clear of the next best entrant.

Championship changes
The championship introduced the brand new Clio Renaultsport 200 Turbo EDC as used in the Renault Clio Eurocup, replacing the older Clio Renaultsport 200. The new car featured a 1.6-litre turbo-powered Renault engine, producing 220 hp, an increase of 15 hp from 2012. The cars also have a sequential six-speed gearbox with paddle-shift gear change.

Teams and drivers
All teams and drivers were British-registered.

Race calendar and results
The provisional calendar was announced by the championship organisers on 23 September 2013. The championship expanded to nine double header race meetings making an 18 round season, up from 16 in 2012. The series returned to Scotland and the Knockhill Racing Circuit for the first time since 2010. Originally, it was announced that the Silverstone Circuit would return after a one year hiatus, with the series missing the round at Thruxton Circuit. However, organisers released a revised calendar with the Thruxton round reinstated and the Silverstone round dropped, due to a date clash with the 2014 Eurocup Clio. All rounds were held in the United Kingdom.

Championship standings

Drivers' championship
A driver's best 16 scores counted towards the championship, with any other points being discarded.

References

Renault Clio Cup
Renault Clio Cup UK seasons